Emmenosperma is a small genus of mostly tropical trees in the family Rhamnaceae. The name comes from the Greek "emmeno" meaning (I cleave) and "sperma", (seed). It refers to the seeds remaining after the fruit valves have fallen away. It is related to Jaffrea, endemic to New Caledonia.

List of species
 Emmenosperma alphitonioides F.Muell. Australia
 Emmenosperma cunninghamii Benth. 
 Emmenosperma micropetalum (A.C.Sm.) M.C.Johnst. 
 Emmenosperma pancherianum Baill.
 Emmenosperma papuanum (Merr. & L.M.Perry) M.C.Johnst.

References

Rhamnaceae
Rhamnaceae genera